Erich Pils (born 30 December 1965) is an Austrian diver. He competed in the men's 3 metre springboard event at the 1988 Summer Olympics.

References

1965 births
Living people
Austrian male divers
Olympic divers of Austria
Divers at the 1988 Summer Olympics